Vujanović is a Serbian and Montenegrin surname, derived from the male given name Vujan, a variant of Vujadin. Notable people with the surname include:

Filip Vujanović (born 1954), Montenegrin politician
Milja Vujanović, Serbian actress
Darko Vujanović, Serbian footballer

See also
Vujadinović
Vujanić

Serbian surnames